San Nicolò is a Roman Catholic, Franciscan church in Cagli, province of Pesaro e Urbino, region of Marche, Italy.

History
The Benedictine order church and monastery date to 1398, but in 1529, the monastery was assigned to Dominican nuns. The main altar, depicting the Madonna of the Rosary and St Dominic'' were painted by Gaetano Lapis.

See also
Catholic Church in Italy

References

Roman Catholic churches in Cagli
14th-century Roman Catholic church buildings in Italy
Churches completed in 1398